Touring theatre is independent travelling theatre that is presented at a different location in each city. A touring theatre is produced by a theater company, called the producing entity, often based in one location, and sold, as a show, by a booking agent to presenters. The presenters are responsible for arranging the venue, local crew, and any other considerations needed and specified in the rider. The presenter pays a set amount of money to the producing entity, and the producing entity then pays the traveling crew by check or direct deposit. The show could be in for one performance on one day, or for a "sit" of a week or longer. Extended engagements can last six weeks or more.

Operation
The contract between the presenter and the producing entity often includes stipulations on force majeure, labor actions, and schedule of compensations and when each payment is due. It can be split between a pre-performance fee, and a fee paid on the day of the performance, once complete. The contract will often stipulate the venue, venue contact information, and technical contacts. Also, the contract may state a minimum stage size, in order to ensure that the production will occur as envisioned. As with any contract, negotiations are possible, and can mean modifications to the set, staging, or responsibilities to the Presenter.

Legalities
Riders proscribe the needed support the touring company requires. They include, but are not limited to, local crew staffing, dressing room access, equipment to be provided by the presenter, minimum turn around time between shows, meals, lodging, parking, and loading dock requirements. The rider is a legal document that is part of the agreement with the presenter and is treated as part of the contract. Hotel accommodation is typically a room per person, although some companies operate on double occupancy, though union or contractual agreements with performers may prohibit this.

 
Theatre companies
Dance companies